The following is a list of automobile manufacturers of Australia.

Current manufacturers 

 ACE EV Group (2017-present)
 Bolwell (1962-present)
 Borland Racing Developments (1984–present)
 Brabham Automotive (2018–present)
 Devaux Cars (2001–present)
 H2X Australia
 Jacer (1995–present)
 Minetti Sports Cars (2003–present)
 Python (1981–present)
 Quantum (2015–present)
 Roaring Forties (1997–present)
 Spartan-V (2004–present)
 Stohr Cars (1991–present)

Former manufacturers 

 Arcadipane (1977–1979)
 Ascort (1958–1960)
 Austin (1954–1983)
 Australian Motor Industries (AMI) (1926–1987)
 Australian Six (1919–1930)
 Australis (1897–1907)
 Birchfield (2003–2004)
 Blade (2008–2013)
 Bolwell (1962-1979)
 Buchanan
 Buckle (1955–1959)
 Bullet (1996–2009) 
 Bush Ranger (2006–2016)
 Caldwell Vale (1907–1913)
 Cheetah
 Chic (1923–1929)
 Chrysler (1957–1981)
 Ford (1925–2016) 
 Ford Performance Vehicles (FPV) (2002–2014)
 Giocattolo (1986–1989)
 Goggomobil (1958–1961)
 Hartnett (1949–1955)
 Holden (1948–2017)
 Holden Special Vehicles (HSV) (1987–2017)
 Honda
 Ilinga
 Kaditcha
 Leyland (1973–1982)
 Lightburn & Co (1963–1965)
 Lloyd-Hartnett (1957–1962)
 Mercedes-Benz (1890–present)
 Mitsubishi (1980–2008) 
 Morris (1947–1973)
 Nissan (1983–1992) 
 Nota (1955–2002)
 Pellandini (1970–1978)
 PRB (1978–2018)
 Puma Clubman (1998–2016)
 Purvis Eureka (1974–1991)
 Shrike (1988–1989)
 Southern Cross (1931–1935)
 Statesman (1971–1984)
 Tarrant (1900–1907)
 Toyota (1963–2017)
 Volkswagen

Manufacturers who have stopped trading
The following manufacturers have stopped trading, however no publicly verifiable instances of their cessation date is not easily accessible. 

 Alpha Sports (1963–?)
 Birkin (1983–?)
 Bowker (1942–?)
 Daytona (2002–?)
 Elfin Cars (1958–?)
 Joss Developments (2004–?)
 Redback (2006–?)
 Spartan Motor Company (2010–?)

See also 
 Automotive industry in Australia
 List of car manufacturers

Sources 

 Hreblay, Marian Suman, Automobile Manufacturers Worldwide Registry,

References 

 
Australia
Economy of Australia-related lists
Australia transport-related lists
Lists of companies of Australia